The Nikitin NV-2 was a single-seat sporting aircraft produced in the USSR from 1935.

Development 
After poor results from the NV-1, Nikitin designed a new sporting aircraft built entirely from wood, with plywood skinned wings and a fuselage built using shpon (layers of birch ply glued over a mold/template). The NV-2 had a retractable tailskid undercarriage, with the main gears retracting backwards into fairings on the underside of the cantilever monoplane. Nikitin secured funding for the NV-2 from Osoaviakhim (Society for assistance to the aviation and chemical industries), and the aircraft was built at OKB-30. Flight testing revealed excellent performance and flying qualities.

Further development resulted in the NV-2bis with a more powerful engine in a long chord NACA cowling, and minor structural modifications. An order for 10 from the Soviet Air Force was abandoned when the factory was assigned to produce the Yakovlev UT-2.

One more prototype was ordered by the UVVS as the UTI-5, incorporating even more strengthening, fully retracting main undercarriage, more power and two machine-guns. The UTI-5 was flown successfully early in 1939 with over 40 test pilots from the VVS and Industry praising the performance of the aircraft, as well as the finish which was far better than that of the Polikarpov I-16. The UVVS ordered 200, (some sources state 20), but production did not take place for unknown reasons.

Variants
 NV-2 - Initial prototype built in 1935 with a 100 hp M-11 engine.
 NV-2bis - Second prototype with more powerful 165 hp MG-11 engine and structural modifications.
 UTI-5 - Fighter Trainer version of NV-2bis, with a 300 hp MG-31 engine, fully retracting main undercarriage and two synchronised machine-guns in the forward fuselage

Specifications (UTI-5)

See also

References

 Gunston, Bill. "Encyclopedia of Russian Aircraft 1875-1995". London:Osprey. 1995.

External links
 http://www.airwar.ru/enc_e/other2/nv2.html
 http://www.ctrl-c.liu.se/misc/RAM/nv-2.html

Nikitin aircraft
Soviet and Russian sport aircraft
1930s Soviet sport aircraft
1930s Soviet military trainer aircraft
Aircraft first flown in 1935